Sir Archibald Islay Campbell, 3rd Baronet (15 May 1825 – 11 September 1866) was a British Conservative politician.

Campbell was the son of John Campbell, Tory MP for Dunbartonshire from 1826 to 1830, and Anna Jane née Sitwell. In 1858, he married Lady Agnes Grosvenor, daughter of Richard Grosvenor, 2nd Marquess of Westminster and Lady Elizabeth Mary née Leveson-Gower.

Campbell was elected Conservative MP for Argyllshire at an 1851 by-election—caused by Duncan McNeill's resignation upon being appointed a senator of the College of Justice—and held the seat until 1857 when he did not seek re-election.

He became the 3rd Baronet of Succoth on 23 July 1846, upon the death of Sir Archibald Campbell, 2nd Baronet. Upon his own death, the title was passed to his younger brother, Sir George Campbell, 4th Baronet.

References

External links
 

UK MPs 1847–1852
UK MPs 1852–1857
1825 births
1866 deaths
Conservative Party (UK) MPs for English constituencies
Baronets in the Baronetage of the United Kingdom